Camille van Camp (3 June 1834, Tongeren - 16 November 1891, Montreux) was a Belgian portrait and landscape painter, watercolorist, and engraver.

Life and work
His father was a lawyer; originally from Antwerp.

He paid a visit to Florence in 1857, where he copied the Old Masters at the Uffizi. Two years later, he did the same thing at the Louvre in Paris.

In 1863, he and his friend, Hippolyte Boulenger, went to Tervuren, the site of a flourishing artists' colony.

Five years later, he was one of the co-founders of the Société Libre des Beaux-Arts. He also published criticism in L’Art libre, a French fine arts journal, and was a correspondent for the Illustrated London News. 

He was one of the illustrators for the first edition of The Legend of Thyl Ulenspiegel, by Charles De Coster. Unfortunately, it was poorly printed and full of typographical errors. Corrections were made for a second edition in 1869, but the work gained little attention until the 1920s, when new illustrations were created.

He died while taking the cure at a spa in Switzerland.

Sources 
 "Camp, Camille J. B. van", In: Ulrich Thieme (Ed.): Allgemeines Lexikon der Bildenden Künstler von der Antike bis zur Gegenwart, Vol.5: Brewer–Carlingen. E. A. Seemann, Leipzig 1911, pg.445 (Online)
 "Van Camp, Camille" in: Dictionnaire des peintres belges (Online)
 Simone Speth-Holterhoff, Camille Van Camp, 1834-1891, preface by Paul Fierens, Brussels, La Renaissance du Livre, 1952

External links 

More works by Van Camp @ ArtNet

1834 births
1891 deaths
Belgian painters
Belgian portrait painters
Belgian watercolourists
Académie Royale des Beaux-Arts alumni
People from Tongeren